Amarachi Grace Okoronkwo  (born 12 December 1992) is a Nigerian footballer who currently plays for Nasarawa Amazons in the Nigerian Women Premier League and the Nigeria women's national football team. She previously played for Kokkola F10 in Finland's Naisten Liiga.

Career

Club career 
For her role in leading Nasarawa Amazons to win the 2017 Nigeria Women Premier League, Okoronkwo was among the four players nominated as the best NWPL player of the year, but lost the award to Rasheedat Ajibade. In May 2018, she was nominated as the best player in the 2017 Nigeria Women Premier League at Nigeria Pitch Awards, but also lost to Ajibade.

International 
Okoronkwo represented Nigeria at 2010 African Women's Championship. She was called up for a friendly game against Germany as preparation for Nigeria's participation in the FIFA Women's World Cup.

In 2018, Okoronkwo featured for Nigeria at 2018 WAFU Women's Cup, winning the bronze medal for the team. She also featured for the Nigeria women's national football team at the 2018 Africa Women Cup of Nations and won the tournament with the team.

Honours 
 2010 African Women's Championship – winners
 2018 WAFU Women's Cup – third place
 2017 Nigeria Women Premier League – winners
 2018 Africa Women Cup of Nations- winners

References

External links
 
 

Nigeria women's international footballers
Living people
1992 births
Nigerian women's footballers
Women's association football midfielders
2019 FIFA Women's World Cup players
Nasarawa Amazons F.C. players
Igbo sportspeople